William Anthony "Tony" Brown (born April 11, 1933) is an American journalist, academic and businessman. He is best known as the commentator of the long running syndicated television show Tony Brown's Journal.

Personal life 
William Anthony "Tony" Brown was born April 11, 1933 to Royal Brown and Catherine Davis Brown in Charleston, West Virginia. He attended the public schools where he excelled in academics, joined the track team, and performed in various school plays. His experience of segregation and poverty as a child later fueled his activism and view on the U.S. Government as an adult.

He joined the Republican Party in 1990.

Accomplishments
 1953 - 1955, he served in the U.S. Army
 1959, he received a BA in Sociology from Wayne State University.
 1961, he received an MA in Psychiatric Social Work from Wayne State University. He is a former faculty member at Central Washington University and Federal City College.
 1962, he became a drama critic for the Detroit Courier
 In 1971 he became executive producer (and sometime host) of the monthly TV program Black Journal.
 1972, he became the founding dean of Howard University's School of Communication.
 In 1977 Black Journal was renamed Tony Brown's Journal.
 In 1988 he wrote, produced, and directed the film The White Girl, which dramatized an African American student's struggle with cocaine addiction.
 1998, wrote Empower The People: A 7-Step plan to Overthrow the Conspiracy that is Stealing Your Money and Freedom
 2002, he was inducted into the National Academy of Television Arts and Sciences' Silver Circle.
 2004, he became the dean of Hampton University's Scripps Howard School of Journalism and Communications. He held the position until 2009, when he stepped down.

Bibliography
 1995 Black Lies, White Lies: The Truth According to Tony Brown. 1997 reprint 
 1999 Empower the People: Overthrow The Conspiracy That Is Stealing Your Money And Freedom. 
 2004 What Mama Taught Me: The Seven Core Values of Life.

See also
 Black conservatism in the United States

References

External links
TonyBrown.com

1933 births
Living people
African-American businesspeople
American businesspeople
Hampton University faculty
Howard University faculty
Wayne State University alumni
University of the District of Columbia faculty
21st-century African-American people
20th-century African-American people
People from Charleston, West Virginia